Niall FitzGerald (1931 – 20 December 2012) was an Irish Gaelic footballer who played as a centre-forward for the Cork senior team.

FitzGerald joined the team during the 1950 championship and was a regular member of the starting fifteen until his retirement following the completion of the 1966 championship. During that time he won one National Football League medal and three Munster medals. FitzGerald was an All-Ireland runner-up on two occasions.

FitzGerald also enjoyed a lengthy club career with Collins and Macroom, winning two county club championship medals.

References

1931 births
2012 deaths
Macroom Gaelic footballers
Cork inter-county Gaelic footballers
Munster inter-provincial Gaelic footballers